Hypochaeris achyrophorus is a species of annual herb in the family Asteraceae. They have a self-supporting growth form. Individuals can grow to 17 cm tall.

Sources

References 

achyrophorus
Flora of Malta